Magliocco may refer to:

The primary name or synonym of several Italian wine grape varieties including:

Magliocco Canino
Magliocco Dolce
Gaglioppo

Surname:

Joseph J. Magliocco, wine and spirits industry executive
Joseph Magliocco, Italian-American mobster
Sabina Magliocco, American academic
Karlha Magliocco, Venezuelan boxer

See also
Magliocca
Malocchio

Italian-language surnames